In mathematics, the category of topological spaces, often denoted Top, is the category whose objects are topological spaces and whose morphisms are continuous maps.  This is a category because the composition of two continuous maps is again continuous, and the identity function is continuous. The study of Top and of properties of topological spaces using the techniques of category theory is known as categorical topology.

N.B. Some authors use the name Top for the categories with topological manifolds, with 
compactly generated spaces as objects and continuous maps as morphisms or with the category of compactly generated weak Hausdorff spaces.

As a concrete category

Like many categories, the category Top is a concrete category, meaning its objects are sets with additional structure (i.e. topologies) and its morphisms are functions preserving this structure. There is a natural forgetful functor
U : Top → Set
to the category of sets which assigns to each topological space the underlying set and to each continuous map the underlying function.

The forgetful functor U has both a left adjoint
D : Set → Top
which equips a given set with the discrete topology, and a right adjoint
I : Set → Top
which equips a given set with the indiscrete topology. Both of these functors are, in fact, right inverses to U (meaning that UD and UI are equal to the identity functor on Set). Moreover, since any function between discrete or between indiscrete spaces is continuous, both of these functors give full embeddings of Set into Top.

Top is also fiber-complete meaning that the category of all topologies on a given set X (called the fiber of U above X) forms a complete lattice when ordered by inclusion. The greatest element in this fiber is the discrete topology on X, while the least element is the indiscrete topology.

Top is the model of what is called a topological category. These categories are characterized by the fact that every structured source  has a unique initial lift . In Top the initial lift is obtained by placing the initial topology on the source. Topological categories have many properties in common with Top (such as fiber-completeness, discrete and indiscrete functors, and unique lifting of limits).

Limits and colimits

The category Top is both complete and cocomplete, which means that all small limits and colimits exist in Top. In fact, the forgetful functor U : Top → Set uniquely lifts both limits and colimits and preserves them as well. Therefore, (co)limits in Top are given by placing topologies on the corresponding (co)limits in Set.

Dually, colimits in Top are obtained by placing the final topology on the corresponding colimits in Set.

Unlike many algebraic categories, the forgetful functor U : Top → Set does not create or reflect limits since there will typically be non-universal cones in Top covering universal cones in Set.

Examples of limits and colimits in Top include:

The empty set (considered as a topological space) is the initial object of Top; any singleton topological space is a terminal object. There are thus no zero objects in Top.
The product in Top is given by the product topology on the Cartesian product. The coproduct is given by the disjoint union of topological spaces.
The equalizer of a pair of morphisms is given by placing the subspace topology on the set-theoretic equalizer. Dually, the coequalizer is given by placing the quotient topology on the set-theoretic coequalizer.
Direct limits and inverse limits are the set-theoretic limits with the final topology and initial topology respectively.
Adjunction spaces are an example of pushouts in Top.

Other properties
The monomorphisms in Top are the injective continuous maps, the epimorphisms are the surjective continuous maps, and the isomorphisms are the homeomorphisms.
The extremal  monomorphisms are (up to isomorphism) the subspace embeddings. In fact, in Top all extremal monomorphisms happen to satisfy the stronger property of being regular.
The extremal epimorphisms are (essentially) the quotient maps. Every extremal epimorphism is regular.
The split monomorphisms are (essentially) the inclusions of retracts into their ambient space.
The split epimorphisms are (up to isomorphism) the continuous surjective maps of a space onto one of its retracts.
There are no zero morphisms in Top, and in particular the category is not preadditive.
Top is not cartesian closed (and therefore also not a topos) since it does not have exponential objects for all spaces. When this feature is desired, one often restricts to the full subcategory of compactly generated Hausdorff spaces CGHaus or the category of compactly generated weak Hausdorff spaces. However, Top is contained in the exponential category of pseudotopologies, which is itself a subcategory of the (also exponential) category of convergence spaces.

Relationships to other categories

The category of pointed topological spaces Top• is a coslice category over Top. 
 The homotopy category hTop has topological spaces for objects and homotopy equivalence classes of continuous maps for morphisms. This is a quotient category of Top. One can likewise form the pointed homotopy category hTop•.
Top contains the important category Haus of Hausdorff spaces as a full subcategory. The added structure of this subcategory allows for more epimorphisms: in fact, the epimorphisms in this subcategory are precisely those morphisms with dense images in their codomains, so that epimorphisms need not be surjective.
Top contains the full subcategory CGHaus of compactly generated Hausdorff spaces, which has the important property of being a Cartesian closed category while still containing all of the typical spaces of interest. This makes CGHaus a particularly convenient category of topological spaces that is often used in place of Top.
 The forgetful functor to Set has both a left and a right adjoint, as described above in the concrete category section.
 There is a functor to the category of locales Loc sending a topological space to its locale of open sets. This functor has a right adjoint that sends each locale to its topological space of points. This adjunction restricts to an equivalence between the category of sober spaces and spatial locales.
The homotopy hypothesis relates Top with ∞Grpd, the category of ∞-groupoids. The conjecture states that ∞-groupoids are equivalent to topological spaces modulo weak homotopy equivalence.

See also

Citations

References 

 Adámek, Jiří, Herrlich, Horst, & Strecker, George E.; (1990). Abstract and Concrete Categories (4.2MB PDF). Originally publ. John Wiley & Sons. . (now free on-line edition).
  
 
 
 Herrlich, Horst: Topologische Reflexionen und Coreflexionen. Springer Lecture Notes in Mathematics 78 (1968).
 Herrlich, Horst: Categorical topology 1971–1981. In: General Topology and its Relations to Modern Analysis and Algebra 5, Heldermann Verlag 1983, pp. 279–383.
 Herrlich, Horst & Strecker, George E.: Categorical Topology – its origins, as exemplified by the unfolding of the theory of topological reflections and coreflections before 1971. In: Handbook of the History of General Topology (eds. C.E.Aull & R. Lowen), Kluwer Acad. Publ. vol 1 (1997) pp. 255–341.

Topological spaces
General topology